Ben Kane (born 22 March 1983) is a former Australian rules footballer who played with Hawthorn in the Australian Football League (AFL) between 2003 and 2006.

References

External links

Living people
1983 births
Australian rules footballers from Victoria (Australia)
Hawthorn Football Club players
Eastern Ranges players
Sturt Football Club players